Agnes of Bohemia  (1305–1337) was the only child of King Wenceslaus II of Bohemia by his second wife, Elisabeth Richeza of Poland. She was a member of the Přemyslid dynasty.

Family 
Her father's previous marriage to Judith of Habsburg had produced four surviving children, Wenceslaus III of Bohemia, Anna of Bohemia, Elisabeth of Bohemia and Margaret of Bohemia. Wenceslaus II died in 1305 and his heir Wenceslaus III was assassinated one year later, in Olomouc, on his way to Poland.

Agnes' mother, Elisabeth, subsequently married Rudolph III, son of Albert of Habsburg (King of the Romans) on 16 October 1306. Rudolph was chosen to be King of Bohemia by part of Czech nobility and Elisabeth remained queen for a short time. Rudolph died 4 July 1307 of dysentery after becoming ill during the siege of the fortress of one of the revolting noblemen, Bavor III of Strakonice. In his last will, Rudolph acknowledged Elizabeth's dowry towns and entailed her a huge amount of money.

Marriage 
Elisabeth arranged for Agnes to marry Henry I of Jawor. The wedding took place in 1316, however, because the two were related in the fourth degree of kinship, a papal dispensation was required. It was granted in 1325. Agnes' brother-in-law, King John of Bohemia opposed the marriage, which would make Henry a powerful rival, along with Bolesław III the Generous, the husband of Margaret of Bohemia, a half-sister of Agnes. 

Shortly after the wedding and, with the consent of Elisabeth, Henry I went with his troops to her dowry town  , Hradec Králové in North Bohemia, where he organized expeditions to support rebels against King John of Bohemia.

Agnes had only one pregnancy which ended in a miscarriage, in the first trimester when she rode with her horse over a hill. This accident kept her in bed for many months. Agnes died in 1337, only two years after her mother and nine years before her husband.

Ancestry

Sources 
 Agnès Przemyslide

1305 births
1337 deaths
Přemyslid dynasty
Piast dynasty
Bohemian princesses
Polish princesses
Deaths in childbirth
Deaths by horse-riding accident
14th-century Bohemian people
14th-century Bohemian women
14th-century Polish people
14th-century Polish women
Accidental deaths in Poland
Daughters of kings